The La Rambla Building is a historic commercial building, built in 1929, in Carmel-by-the-Sea, California. The structure is recognized as an important  Spanish Eclectic-style building in the city's Downtown Conservation District Historic Property Survey, and was nominated and submitted to the California Register of Historical Resources on January 30, 2003. The building is occupied by Club di Lusso.

History

The La Rambla Building is a two-story wood-framed  Spanish Eclectic-style commercial building, constructed in 1929, on Lincoln Street between Ocean and 7th Avenues in Carmel-by-the-Sea, California. The building was designed by architect Guy O. Koepp and built by Carlyle Stoney for Josephine Baber. It has shops on the ground floor and two apartments on the second floor. It has a central-arcade passageway on the first floor leading to a lower garden courtyard and stairs to the upper floor. The passageway floor has flat ceramic tiles from Seville, Spain. The exterior walls are textured cement stucco. The ground floor has three large arched openings with two display windows at either side of the passageway. The upper floor overhangs the ground floor with wood brackets above the walkway and has two large recessed arched bays with French doors opening out onto balconies with wrought iron railings. Above the left balcony and window is a tower with low-pitched Spanish roof. Above the passageway is a flat tile roof and two small, wrought iron grilled windows, and an arched tile roof over the second balcony.

The La Rambla Building qualifies for inclusion in the city's Downtown Conservation District Historic Property Survey, and has been nominated and submitted to the California Register of Historical Resources on January 30, 2003, by Kent L. Seavey. The property is significant under the California Register criterion 3, in architecture, as it represents the commercial work of builder A. Carlyle Stoney, as one of three other remaining arcade passageway Spanish Eclectic-style buildings in Carmel. They include, Edward G. Kuster's Court of the Golden Bough (1923-1925), which includes Sade's (now Porta Bella’s with patio dining), Seven Arts Shop (now Body Frenzy) and the Carmel Weavers Studio (now Cottage of Sweets); the El Paseo Building (1928), and the Las Tiendas Building (1929). The buildings have a mid-block pedestrian passageway, from street to street, which was first introduced to Carmel in the mid 1920s.

The La Rambla property has been the home of several businesses over the years. The earliest retail business in 1929, was designer Frederick Rummelle's shop of Spanish and Mexican antiques and art. The lower courtyard was the home to an outdoor garden shop called Aslan's Garden. The original "Garden Shop" was created by Carmel artist Milton "Milt" Williams in 1958. Today it is the home of Club di Lusso, a women's clothing store. Several additions and remodelings took place over the years. In 1938, an addition was done. In 1991 and 1994, the roof was redone with a skylight added above the arcade pass through. A major renovation of the building was done in 2014-2017.

A. Carlyle Stoney
Augustus Carlyle Stoney (1890-1949), also known as A. C. Stoney, was born on August 24, 1890, in Beaver, Utah. His father was Augustus Joseph Stoney (1865-1938) and his mother was Harriet Susanna Blackner (1869-1936), that came from a Mormon pioneer family. He was married to Rosa Cound (1896-1993) in 1938 in California.

He got a mining degree from the University of Utah, at Salt Lake City. He took a job at the Brigham Copper Mines as an engineer. Stoney came to Carmel in 1917, from Utah, with his four brothers, Maurice, Robert, Paul, and Ronald, who were carpenters. They went to work for master builder M. J. Murphy. During World War I, he was the purchasing agent for the Henry J. Kaiser Richmond Shipyards in Richmond, California. They worked for Murphy until 1925, when the four brothers established their own contracting and building company. Stoney built his home on Carmel Point, on the third base line of the old Abalone League baseball field.

In 1920, he was a volunteer for the Carmel Fire Department. In 1932, Stoney built the Spanish Eclectic Reardon Building on Ocean Avenue and Mission Street, also known as the Carmel Dairy, for Thomas Reardon.

Stoney died of a heart attack on August 16, 1949, while on a fishing trip to Walker Meadows near Mono, California, at the age of 58. Funeral services were held at Paul's Mortuary, Pacific Grove, California. Mark Cram of the Church of the Latter-Day Saints of Sacramento, California, a friend of the family officiated. Interment was at the Oak Hill Memorial Park in San Jose, California.

See also
List of Historic Buildings in Carmel-by-the-Sea

References

External links

 Downtown Conservation District Historic Property Survey

1929 establishments in California
Carmel-by-the-Sea, California
Buildings and structures in Monterey County, California
Spanish Colonial Revival architecture in California